Eli is a large Israeli settlement in the West Bank organized as a community settlement. Located on Highway 60 north of Jerusalem and Ramallah, between the Palestinian villages of As-Sawiya and Qaryut, part of whose lands were expropriated for the establishment of Eli. It was named after the biblical high-priest who served in the Tabernacle in nearby biblical Shiloh (1 Samuel 1:9).

The international community considers Israeli settlements in the West Bank illegal under international law, but the Israeli government disputes this.

History
Eli, named after the Biblical high priest of the Israelites, was established on 11 September 1984, when three families moved into recently placed buildings. It was the first settlement to be attempted without a core group of families. Several families from Ofra, Kokhav HaShahar, and Shilo were persuaded to come for at least a year while more families would be found. The settlement was originally called 'Givat Levona' after the adjacent settlement Ma'ale Levona. The Amana website states that the initial vision was creating 'one long territorial contiguity' of Jewish settlers between Eli and both Shiloh and Ma'ale Levona.

According to ARIJ, Israel confiscated land from two nearby Palestinian villages in order to construct Eli: 1,551 dunums from As-Sawiya and 623 dunums from Qaryut.

In recent years the town has evolved into the municipal center for the Shilo area settlement bloc. Eli is also home to the Bnei David pre-military Mechina academy. This yeshiva also offers post-army academic programs.

Bnei David Academy

Bnei David is the first pre-military Orthodox Mechina academy (1988), and was founded by rabbis Eli Sadan and Yig'al Levinstein. Many of the graduates have reached high rank in the IDF. It is an integral part of Eli, as many of the rabbis, administrators, graduates, and students live in Eli. There are currently over 500 students studying at Bnei David, and over 2,500 graduates, over 40% of them became officers, and the majority served in combatant or elite units.
Shimon Peres has called it "Pride for the country".

Co-founder of the academy, Rabbi Yigal Levinstein, went on record in 2016  claiming gay people were 'sick and perverted' and that drafting women into the IDF deprived them of their Jewishness. In 2018 Rabbi Yosef Kelner asserted that women had feeble minds and a reduced spirituality. In April 2019, the head of the school, Rabbi Eliezer Kashtiel (he), was filmed lecturing to students on the genetic inferiority of gentiles, Palestinians, on their stupidity, and the need for them to be enslaved. He endorsed racism, and the superiority of the Jewish people. In another lecture, Rabbi Giora Redler stated the Holocaust was a divine punishment to make Jews leave the diaspora, that Hitler was correct 'in every word he said… he was just on the wrong side,' that humanism was the real holocaust, not Hitler's murdering of Jews.

Graduates of Bnei David who died during their IDF service include Roi Klein, Emmanuel Moreno, and Amihai Merhavia.

Expansion plans 
In 2013, the Israeli Civil Administration published a master plan (no. 237) which, if approved, would legitimize hundreds of the structures in Eli and incorporate Eli's four outposts, from the land of Palestinian villages As-Sawiye and Al-Lubban ash-Sharqiya, and Quaryut. It covers 1,000 dunams, but would allow the expansion of other outposts to embrace 6,000 dunams, including privately owned Palestinian land. Within the plan's map, there are 7 Palestinian enclaves, where Palestinians may carry out agricultural projects, but are denied the right to build. The plan depends on declaring collectively owned Palestinian village lands in question as ownerless under Ottoman law, a classification which allows them to be defined as "state property" reserved for Jews alone.

Israeli-Palestinian conflict
In 2013, representatives of the nearby Palestinian village of Qaryut blamed Eli settlers for an alleged uprooting of more than 100 olive trees on their property.

In January 2014, an Eli resident claimed to have photographed Palestinians chopping down an olive tree which a later report on Ma'an news blamed 'settlers' for the incident.

In August 2015, a gas station was firebombed on Route 60 near Eli. Later, two Palestinian from Awarta, members of PFLP claimed the attack was a retaliation for the firebombing at Duma.

References

External links
Official website
Bnei David Military Yeshiva

Populated places established in 1984
Mixed Israeli settlements
Mateh Binyamin Regional Council
1984 establishments in the Palestinian territories
Community settlements
Israeli settlements in the West Bank